Ahmed Qasem (born 12 July 2003) is a Swedish professional footballer who plays as an attacking midfielder for Swedish club IF Elfsborg.

International career 
Born in Sweden, Qasem is of Iraqi descent. He has represented Sweden internationally at under-17, under-18 and under-19 levels.

References

External links
 
 Ahmed Qasem at Lagstatistik
 Profile at IF Elfsborg

2003 births
Living people
People from Motala Municipality
Swedish people of Iraqi descent
Swedish footballers
Association football midfielders
Motala AIF players
IF Elfsborg players
Division 2 (Swedish football) players
Ettan Fotboll players
Allsvenskan players
Sweden youth international footballers
Footballers from Östergötland County